Henry Antonie "Harry" Vos (4 September 1946 – 19 May 2010) was a Dutch footballer who played as a defender.

Club career 

During his club career he played for ADO Den Haag, PSV Eindhoven and Feyenoord Rotterdam in the Eredivisie.

International career 

He was part of the Netherlands squad who finished as runners-up in the 1974 FIFA World Cup. However, he never earned any caps for the national team.

Death 
He died of cancer in 2010.

References 

1946 births
2010 deaths
Dutch footballers
1974 FIFA World Cup players
Feyenoord players
PSV Eindhoven players
Eredivisie players
ADO Den Haag players
Footballers from The Hague
Deaths from cancer in the Netherlands
UEFA Cup winning players
Association football defenders